In software, a wildcard character is a kind of placeholder represented by a single character, such as an asterisk, which can be interpreted as a number of literal characters or an empty string. It is often used in file searches so the full name need not be typed.

Telecommunication
In telecommunications, a wildcard is a character that may be substituted for any of a defined subset of all possible characters.

 In high-frequency (HF) radio automatic link establishment, the wildcard character  may be substituted for any one of the 36 upper-case alphanumeric characters.
 Whether the wildcard character represents a single character or a string of characters must be specified.

Computing
In computer (software) technology, a wildcard is a symbol used to replace or represent one or more characters. Algorithms for matching wildcards have been developed in a number of recursive and non-recursive varieties.

File and directory patterns
When specifying file names (or paths) in CP/M, DOS, Microsoft Windows, and Unix-like operating systems, the asterisk character (also called "star") matches zero or more characters. For example,  matches  and  but not .

In Unix-like and DOS operating systems, the question mark  matches exactly one character.

In Unix shells and Windows PowerShell, ranges of characters enclosed in square brackets ( and ) match a single character within the set; for example,  matches any single uppercase or lowercase letter. In Unix shells, a leading exclamation mark  negates the set and matches only a character not within the list. In shells that interpret  as a history substitution, a leading caret  can be used instead.

The operation of matching of wildcard patterns to multiple file or path names is referred to as globbing.

Databases
In SQL, wildcard characters can be used in LIKE expressions; the percent sign  matches zero or more characters, and underscore  a single character. Transact-SQL also supports square brackets ( and ) to list sets and ranges of characters to match, a leading caret  negates the set and matches only a character not within the list. In Microsoft Access, the asterisk sign  matches zero or more characters, the question mark  matches a single character, the number sign  matches a single digit (0–9), and square brackets can be used for sets or ranges of characters to match.

Regular expressions
In regular expressions, the period (also called "dot") is the wildcard pattern which matches any single character. Combined with the asterisk operator  it will match any number of any characters.

In this case, the asterisk is also known as the Kleene star.

See also
 glob (programming)
 Pattern matching
 Query by Example
 Wildcard DNS record
 wildmat

References

External links
How to Use Wildcards

Computer file formats
Pattern matching